Blind Willie Walker (April 1896 – March 4, 1933) was an early American blues guitarist and singer, who played the Piedmont blues style. He was described by blues musicians such as Reverend Gary Davis and Pink Anderson as an outstanding guitarist. Josh White called him the best guitarist he had ever heard, even better than Blind Blake: "Blake was quick, but Walker was like Art Tatum."  In his performances, he was often accompanied by guitarist Sam Brooks.

Biography
Walker was born in O'Neal Township, and was blind from birth.  He spent most of his life in and around Greenville. He worked as an itinerant musician, and spent time with Gary Davis in 1912/13. From 1923 he was led occasionally by Josh White, and later by Sam Brooks, who was Walker's cousin.

On 6 December 1930, Walker recorded for Columbia Records in Atlanta, Georgia. This session produced his only known titles, including "South Carolina Rag", later recorded by John Jackson.  Walker played in an exceptionally fast style, and his "clear, minstrelsy vocals complemented his delicate yet strongly structured guitar lines."  He specialized in playing in the key of C.

Blind Willie Walker died in Greenville in 1933, aged about 36, of congenital syphilis, which may have been the reason for his blindness. On his death certificate he was listed as being a professional musician.

The compositions "Make Believe Stunt" and "Cincinnati Flow Rag" ("Slow Drag"), made famous by Reverend Gary Davis, were attributed to Walker, who had taught Davis how to play the guitar.

Discography
 "Dupree Blues" / "South Carolina Rag" (CO-14578-D)

Also recorded, but never issued, were the songs "Rider Blues" and "Da Da Da". A second take of "South Carolina Rag" has appeared on several compilation albums, including Ragtime Blues Guitar 1928-30 (1982, Matchbox Records).

References

External links
 Illustrated Willie Walker discography

1896 births
1933 deaths
American blues guitarists
American male guitarists
Deaths from syphilis
Musicians from Greenville, South Carolina
Blind musicians
20th-century American guitarists
Guitarists from South Carolina
20th-century American male musicians